James Malcolm,  (July 14, 1880 – December 6, 1935) was a Canadian politician who was the Member of Parliament for Bruce North from 1921 to 1935 and served as Minister of Trade and Commerce from 1926 to 1930.

Early life 
James Malcolm was born July 14, 1889 in Kincardine, Ontario to Andrew Malcolm, Member of the Legislative Assembly of Ontario and Annie Robertson.

In 1905 at the age of 16, Malcolm married Ethel A. Swan whom he lived with in Kincardine.

Malcolm's father owned and operated a furniture company in Kincardine, Ontario. Malcolm and his brother joined their father's company in which Malcolm become chairman and ran the Kincardine factory.

Politics 
Malcolm was elected to the House of Commons of Canada representing the Ontario riding of Bruce North in the 1921 federal election. A Liberal, he was re-elected in 1925, 1926, and 1930.

From 1926 to 1930, he served as Minister of Trade and Commerce in the cabinet of Prime Minister William Lyon Mackenzie King.

Legacy 
Malcolm was the first Canadian to make a public address by Trans-Atlantic telephone in 1928, delivering a speech to the British Empire Exhibition in Cardiff, Wales from Ottawa. Canada.

In 1923, Malcolm purchased a large mansion in Kincardine. The building still stands today as a retirement residence and bares the name 'Malcolm Place' in his honour.

Archives 
There is a James Malcom fonds at Library and Archives Canada.

References

External links
 

1880s births
1935 deaths
Liberal Party of Canada MPs
Members of the House of Commons of Canada from Ontario
Members of the King's Privy Council for Canada